X, or x, is the twenty-fourth and third-to-last letter in the Latin alphabet, used in the modern English alphabet, the alphabets of other western European languages and others worldwide. Its  name in English is "ex" (pronounced ), plural exes. X is regularly pronounced as "ks".

History

Pronunciation and use

English
In English orthography,  is typically pronounced as the voiceless consonant cluster  when it follows the stressed vowel (e.g. ox), and the voiced consonant  when it precedes the stressed vowel (e.g. exam). It is also pronounced  when it precedes a silent  and a stressed vowel (e.g. exhaust). It also makes the sound  in words ending in -xion (except for axion). When  ends a word, it is always  (e.g. fax), except in loan words such as faux (see French, below).

When  does start a word, it is usually pronounced 'z' (e.g. xylophone, xenophobia, and xanthan). Chinese names starting with Xi like Xiaomi or Xinjiang). In abbreviations, it can represent "trans-" (e.g. XMIT for transmit, XFER for transfer), "cross-" (e.g. X-ing for crossing, XREF for cross-reference), "Christ-"  (e.g. Xmas for Christmas, Xian for Christian), the "crys-" in crystal (XTAL), "by" (SXSW for South by Southwest) or various words starting with "ex-" (e.g. XL for extra large, XOR for exclusive-or, or the extinction symbol).

X is the third least frequently used letter in English (after  and ), with a frequency of about 0.15% in words.

Other languages
In some languages, as a result of assorted phonetic changes, handwriting adaptations or simply spelling convention,  has other pronunciations:
In Basque,  represents . Additionally there is the digraph  .
In Dutch,  usually represents , except in the name of the island of Texel, which is pronounced Tessel. This is because of historical sound-changes in Dutch, where all  sounds have been replaced by  sounds. Dierckx, Hendrickx, Koninckx, Sterckx, Vranckx).
In German, generally pronounced ; in native words, however, such as Ochs or wachsen,  the cluster  is often written .
Three exceptions are pronounced : six ("six"), dix ("ten") and in some city names such as Bruxelles (although some people pronounce it 'ks') or Auxerre; it is fully pronounced  in Aix, the name of several towns. It is pronounced  in sixième and dixième. Otherwise  or (primarily in words beginning with ex- followed by a vowel) .
In several related languages, notably Venetian, it represents the voiced sibilant . It is also used, mainly amongst the young people, as a short written form for "per", meaning "for": for example, "x sempre" ("forever"). This is because in Italian the multiplication sign (similar to ) is called "per".
In Old Spanish,  was pronounced , as it is still currently in other Iberian Romance languages. Later, the sound evolved to a hard  sound. Presently,  represents the sound  (word-initially), or the consonant cluster  (e.g. oxígeno, examen). Rarely, it can be pronounced  as in Old Spanish in some proper nouns such as 'Raxel' (a variant of Rachel) and Uxmal.
In Galician and Leonese,  is pronounced  in most cases (often used in place of etymological g or j). The pronunciation  occurs in learned words, such as 'taxativo' (taxing). However, Galician speakers tend to pronounce it , especially when it appears before plosives, such as in 'externo' (external).
Other sounds are: ; 'fixar' (to fix), ; 'examen'. In addition,  gets voiced to  before voiced consonants; 'caixmir'. Catalan also has the digraph , pronounced .
In Sardinian and Ligurian, X represents .
In Venetian, it represents the voiced alveolar sibilant  much like in Portuguese 'exagerado', English 'xylophone' or in the French 'sixième'. Examples from medieval texts include raxon (reason), prexon (prison), dexerto (desert), chaxa or caxa (home). Nowadays, the best-known word is xe (is/are). The most notable exception to this rule is the name Venexia  in which  has evolved from the initial voiced sibilant  to the present day voiceless sibilant.
In Albanian,  represents , while the digraph  represents .
In Maltese,  is pronounced  or, in some cases,  (only in loanwords such as 'televixin', and not for all speakers).

Additionally, in languages for which the Latin alphabet has been adapted only recently,  has been used for various sounds, in some cases inspired by European usage, but in others, for consonants uncommon in Europe. For these no Latin letter stands out as an obvious choice, and since most of the various European pronunciations of  can be written by other means, the letter becomes available for more unusual sounds.
 represents  (voiceless velar fricative) in e.g. Azerbaijani, Kurdish (Hawar alphabet), Georgian (when Latinized), Lojban, Pashto (when Latinized), Tatar (Jaꞑalif, Zamanälif, official romanization of 2012), Uzbek, and Uyghur (Latin script).
In transliteration of Indian languages, primarily Indo-Aryan languages,  represents the consonant cluster  in alternate spellings of words containing 'क्ष' (kṣ), especially names such as Laxmi and Dixit. Less frequently,  is used to represent 'ख़' .
In Apache  represents 
In Nahuatl,  represents .
In Nguni languages,  represents the alveolar lateral click .
In Pirahã,  symbolizes the glottal stop .
An illustrating example of "x" as a "leftover" letter is differing usage in three different Cushitic languages:
Afar: voiced alveolar implosive 
Oromo: alveolar ejective 
Somali: voiceless pharyngeal fricative 
In East and Southeast Asia:
In Lao, based on romanization of Lao consonants,  may represent , e.g. in Lan Xang.
In Vietnamese,  is pronounced like English  (at the beginning of a word, e.g. "sing").
In Hanyu Pinyin, Standard Chinese's official transcription system in China, Malaysia, Singapore, and Taiwan, the letter  represents the voiceless alveolo-palatal fricative , for instance in 'Xi', .

Other systems
In the International Phonetic Alphabet,  represents a voiceless velar fricative.

Other uses
In mathematics, x is commonly used as the name for an independent variable or unknown value. The modern tradition of using x, y and z to represent an unknown (incognita) was introduced by René Descartes in La Géométrie (1637). As a result of its use in algebra, X is often used to represent unknowns in other circumstances (e.g. X-rays, Generation X, The X-Files, and The Man from Planet X; see also Malcolm X).

On some identification documents, the letter X represents a non-binary gender, where F means female and M means male.

In the Cartesian coordinate system, x is used to refer to the horizontal axis.

It is also sometimes used as a typographic approximation for the multiplication sign, . In mathematical typesetting, x meaning an algebraic variable is normally in italic type, partly to avoid confusion with the multiplication symbol. In fonts containing both x (the letter) and × (the multiplication sign), the two glyphs are dissimilar.

It can be used as an abbreviation for 'between' in the context of historical dating; e.g., '1483 x 1485'.

Maps and other images sometimes use an X to label a specific location, leading to the expression "X marks the spot".

The Roman numeral X represents the number 10.

The Suzhou numeral 〤 represents the number 4.

In art or fashion, the use of X indicates a collaboration by two or more artists, e.g. Aaron Koblin x Takashi Kawashima. This application, which originated in Japan, now extends to other kinds of collaboration outside the art world. This usage mimics the use of a similar mark in denoting botanical hybrids, for which scientifically the multiplication × is used, but informally a lowercase "x" is also used.

At the end of a letter or other correspondence, 'x' can mean a kiss; the earliest example of this usage cited by the Oxford English Dictionary is from 1878.

An X rating denotes media such as movies that are intended for adults only.

Related characters

Descendants and related characters in the Latin alphabet
X with diacritics: Ẍ ẍ Ẋ ẋ X̂ x̂ ᶍ
IPA-specific symbols related to X: 
Teuthonista phonetic transcription-specific symbols related to X:

ˣ : Modifier letter small x is used for phonetic transcription
ₓ : Subscript small x is used in Indo-European studies

Ancestors and siblings in other alphabets
Χ χ : Greek letter Chi, from which the following derive:
Х х : Cyrillic letter Kha
 : Coptic letter Khe, which derives from Greek Chi
 : Gothic letter enguz, which derives from Greek Chi
 𐌗 : Old Italic X, which derives from Greek Chi, and is the ancestor of modern Latin X
 : Runic letter Gyfu, which may derive from old Italic X
Ξ ξ : Greek letter Xi, which was used in place of Chi in the Eastern (and the modern) Greek alphabets

Computing

Computing codes

 1 

In the C programming language, "x" preceded by zero (as in 0x or 0X) is used to denote hexadecimal literal values.

X is commonly used as a prefix term in nouns related to the X Window System and Unix.

Other representations

See also
X mark
X.com

References

External links

ISO basic Latin letters
Cross symbols